The Guatemalan broad-clawed shrew (Cryptotis griseoventris) is a species of small-eared shrew in the family Soricidae. It is known from Guatemala and the Mexican state of Chiapas, where it has been found in montane forests of oak, pine and fir, as well as secondary forest, at elevations above . It feeds on insects. Deforestation and habitat fragmentation are major threats, particularly in Chiapas. It was formerly considered conspecific with C. goldmani.

References

Cryptotis
Mammals of Mexico
Mammals of Central America